Timothy Christian Schools is a private, nondenominational Christian school in Elmhurst, Illinois, founded in 1911.

Academics 
The school is recognized by the state of Illinois and the DuPage County Education Service Region. Timothy Christian Schools is fully accredited by the North Central Association through Cognia and is recognized by the Illinois State Board of Education. Timothy Christian Schools is also a member of the Council on Educational Standards and Accountability. In September 2019, Timothy Christian High School was awarded a National Blue Ribbon from the US Department of Education.  In 2021, three Timothy Students were named National Merit Finalists.

Facilities 
Timothy Christian Schools has undergone $50 million in renovations, including a $16 million middle school and Athletic Arena. Project highlights include state-of-the-art classrooms, science lab, lobby/cafeteria, and new athletic arena for the high school. The elementary school recently underwent a renovation along with furniture and technology upgrades in the high school. The high school is undergoing a renovation that includes new open spaces, a secured entrance, and a coffee shop.

Athletics 
Timothy Christian Schools is a member of the Illinois High School Association as well as the Metro Suburban Conference. There are ten sports available for boys: baseball, basketball, cross country, golf, gymnastics, soccer, swimming, track and field, and volleyball. There are twelve sports available for girls: badminton, basketball, cross country, competitive cheerleading, competitive dance, golf, softball, soccer, swimming, tennis, track and field and volleyball.

Activities

Mock trial 
Timothy Christian High School has a Mock Trial team which has won seven Mock Trial State Championships and had national appearances.   For the 2020-2021 school year, Mock Trial competed virtually and Timothy placed third in the state.

History

Chicago campus 
The school began as a vision of several members of Douglas Park Christian Reformed Church. In April 1907, a Society for Christian Instruction was formed to explore the possibility of founding a school in the neighborhood known as the "Groninger Hoek." After a year of growth, the society chose the name "Timothy" for their proposed school to honor the New Testament evangelist who had been raised in a Christian home and given spiritual instruction by the apostle Paul. By August 1911, the society had raised enough funds to open the school. They did so above several retail establishments on Roosevelt Road on Chicago's west side.

After a year in this building, the society purchased a lot on the corner of 13th street and Tripp Avenue, a few blocks away from the original premises. This lot was purchased for $1,500. The school would remain in this building for only fifteen years, but in 1916, they received full accreditation from the Chicago Board of Education. The school continued to add rooms to the basement in order to accommodate more students. Initially, the school only served elementary students. By 1918, students were able to continue their education at Chicago Christian High School in the Englewood neighborhood.

Much of the instruction of the students was undertaken in Dutch to help students maintain a link to their Dutch heritage. Very early, though, the school opened its doors to students of diverse nationalities and religious doctrines. By 1926, the school board made a resolution to maintain its minutes in English instead of Dutch. This also came at the same time that the school was paying off the last of its debt before the stock market crash of 1929 and before moving to a new location.

By 1927, the Dutch population had shifted from the west side of the city to the inner western suburbs of Chicago. As the families moved, so did their churches, and parents became less willing to send their children back to schools such as Timothy that remained in the old neighborhood. Early in 1927, Timothy was able to sell its Tripp Avenue school building to a Jewish congregation, but were forced to vacate within six months. Work began on a new building almost immediately. It was decided to build the new school in Cicero, Illinois because it was a central location to many of the families that had relocated west of the city of Chicago. The new school building opened in September 1927 with 156 pupils in four completed rooms on 14th Street.

Disbanding Ebenezer School 
The time in Cicero was marked by two crises for the school. The first was the integration of more than 100 students from Ebenezer Christian School in Chicago. As the Dutch Christian Reformed communities had fled the city for the suburbs, Ebenezer became impossible to keep open. This had been the first Dutch reformed school to open on Chicago's west side in 1893. It closed in 1946, and the huge influx of students to Timothy caused a great deal of tension. Students were forced to endure large class sizes and little time alone with the teachers. There was also the problem of social integration of a suburban student body with one hailing from the tough streets of Chicago.

Timothy-Lawndale controversy 
The integration of the students from Ebenezer Christian School was far easier to deal with than the racial integration of the school. In 1965, a group of African American parents attending Lawndale and Garfield Christian Reformed Churches asked the Timothy board permission to enroll their children at the school. Cicero was, at the time, a town with around 70,000 residents of European descent and had earned the reputation as the “Selma of the North.” One black family had attempted to move into the city in 1951 and they had been chased out by a white mob. The Timothy school board decided to delay the enrollment of these students. The board insisted that it was not acting on racist motives, but only that it was worried for the safety of its students. The school only admitted three African American students in 1967 after Timothy Christian High School had moved to the western suburb of Elmhurst.

As Cicero residents continued to harass the school and church members continued to advise against integration, Timothy decided to wait until it could complete the move to a campus in a more racially tolerant suburb. This move to Elmhurst was finally made in 1972. In the meantime, the parents of Lawndale and Garfield Christian Reformed Churches had established their own school, West Side.

Education during the COVID-19 pandemic 
Timothy Christian School offered full-time in person learning starting in the 2020-2021 school year after switching to remote learning for part of the 2019-2020 school year. Remote learning was also available to families that desired it.   In 2021 the Illinois State Board of Education stopped officially recognizing the school because the school did not agree to require masks as per Illinois orders. Recognition was returned after the school began requiring face masks to be worn.

Notable alumni
Rick Huisman, former MLB pitcher
Wayne Huizenga, founder of Waste Management and AutoNation, former owner of Miami Dolphins, Florida Marlins, and Florida Panthers, former co-owner of Blockbuster
Peter Huizenga, Waste Management executive and philanthropist

References

External links
timothychristian.com 

Christian schools in Illinois
Cicero, Illinois
Educational institutions established in 1911
Private elementary schools in Illinois
Elmhurst, Illinois
Private high schools in Illinois
Private middle schools in Illinois
Nondenominational Christian schools in the United States
Schools in DuPage County, Illinois
1911 establishments in Illinois